The Music Remains the Same (A Tribute to Led Zeppelin) is a tribute album of Led Zeppelin songs. It was released on 25 November 2002 by American record label Locomotive Music.

Track listing
"Kashmir" – Angra
"Dazed and Confused" – Blaze
"The Rover" – Primal Fear
"Babe I'm Gonna Leave You" – Doro
"Rock and Roll" – Elegy
"Communication Breakdown" – Tierra Santa
"No Quarter" – Grave Digger
"Black Dog" – Masterplan
"Immigrant Song" – Consortium Project
"Whole Lotta Love" – Mägo De Oz
"Good Times Bad Times" – Axxis
"Stairway to Heaven" – White Skull

References

External links
Locomotive official site

Led Zeppelin tribute albums
2002 compilation albums